Mastana Mahi is a Pakistani telenovela broadcast by Hum TV. Airing on Thursdays, the telenovela premiered on 26 May 2011 and ended its run on 15 September 2011. It stars actors Fahad Mustafa, Mehreen Raheel and Sajal Aly in the lead roles. The theme song of drama is sung by Sohail Haider. Mastana Mahi was also broadcast in India by Zindagi premiering on 6 November 2014.

Plot
An ex-pat girl, Aaleen, gets romantically involved with a man her father's age. Meanwhile, a politician's son, Adal, is forced to marry a child bride, Suhaai. Aaleen marries Mike, and after her miscarriage, she divorces him. Adal loves Aaleen and marries her after telling the truth about his first marriage with Suhaai.

Once they return to Pakistan, the bonding between Aaleen and Suhaai goes stronger day by day. After six years, when Suhaai moves to Adal's house after ruksati, Aaleen begins to feel jealous of Suhaai and wants Suhaai to permanently leave Adal. After Suhaai gets pregnant, Aaleen wants to kill her unborn child. Adal discovers Aaleen's evil plan and asks her to leave the house. Suhaai bears a son and asks Aaleen to return to the house. Adal then forgives Aaleen.

However, this relationship between Aaleen and Adal is tested by time and the relationship of those around them.

Cast
 Fahad Mustafa as Adal Soomro
 Mehreen Raheel as Aaleen Mike/ Aaleen Adal Soomro (the second wife of Adal)
 Arisha Razi as young Suhaai
 Sajal Aly as Suhaai Adal Soomro (the first wife of Adal)
 Deepti Gupta as Lilly 
 Sakina Samo as Adil's mother
 Mahmood Aslam as Aleen's father
 Saba Hameed as Aleen's mother
 Imran Peerzada as Mike
 Nida Khan as Simran
 Nimra Bucha as Pooja
 Saboor Aly as Fatima Suhaai's friend

Lux Style Awards
 '''''Best TV Actor (Satellite)-Fahad Mustafa-Nominated

References

External links
Mastana Mahi on the website Hum TV

Pakistani drama television series
Hum TV original programming
2011 Pakistani television series debuts
2011 Pakistani television series endings
Urdu-language telenovelas
Pakistani telenovelas
Zee Zindagi original programming